Agalychnis taylori, commonly known as the red-eyed tree frog or Taylor's leaf frog, is a species of frog in the subfamily Phyllomedusinae. It was originally described as a subspecies of Agalychnis callidryas in 1957. In 1967 it was synonymized with Agalychnis callidryas by Savage and Heyer. In 2019, it was resurrected and elevated to a full species based on well-supported morphological data. The range of Agalychnis taylori extends from central Veracruz, Mexico, to west-central Honduras.

References

External links
 

taylori
Amphibians of Belize
Amphibians of Guatemala
Amphibians of Honduras
Amphibians of Mexico
Amphibians described in 1957